Saeed Ahmed Hatteea (born 2 February 1950) is a former Indian cricketer. He was a right-arm fast-medium bowler and a right-handed batsman.

Hatteea was born in Bombay, India. In 1962, he moved with his family to England, where he attended the City of London School. Having played several matches for England schools and one Second XI Championship match for Warwickshire in 1969, he was invited by India's chairman of selectors, Vijay Merchant, to play in India. He made his first-class debut for Bombay against Saurashtra in the 1969–70 Ranji Trophy. He played three further first-class matches for Bombay that season, and was expected by some to be named in the squad for national team's tour of the West Indies, but he was not selected.

Hatteea returned to England for the 1970 season, where he played second XI cricket for Gloucestershire. He also played for a Rest of the World XI against TN Pearce's XI in England that September. Back in India later in the year, he played two further matches for Bombay, and made a single appearance for West Zone against South Zone, in the 1970–71 Duleep Trophy semi-final. In his 8 first-class matches, he took 27 wickets at a bowling average of 28.29.  His only five wicket haul came against Gujarat for Bombay.

Having returned to England, Hatteea played minor counties cricket for Oxfordshire, making 3 Minor Counties Championship appearances for the county in 1972. It was for Oxfordshire that he made his only List A appearance against Durham in the Gillette Cup. In this match he scored an unbeaten 6 runs.  With the ball he took 4 wickets for the cost of 32 runs from 9.2 overs. He later played club cricket for Chorleywood and The Hurlingham Club.

References

External links
Saeed Hatteea at ESPNcricinfo
Saeed Hatteea at CricketArchive

1950 births
Living people
Cricketers from Mumbai
Indian cricketers
Mumbai cricketers
West Zone cricketers
Oxfordshire cricketers